Prince of Peace Lutheran Church is located on 75th Street in Woodridge, Illinois, just west of the Veteran's Memorial Tollway (I-355) near 75th and Janes Avenue.  The church is part of the Evangelical Lutheran Church in America (ELCA).  Prince of Peace is the only Lutheran church in Woodridge.

History of the Church

The first worship was held at Goodrich School on October 15, 1961, as part of a mission of the Augustana Lutheran Church.  On January 22, 1962, Prince of Peace became an official congregation with 66 baptized members.  The church building was completed 1966, and then only consisted of the main sanctuary and the "North" Room.  The sanctuary is designed in an octagonal shape, with exposed bricks and dark wooden beams throughout.  The large multipurpose "East" Room was added in 1970, designed to host gatherings and events.  Classrooms were added in 1982, and the office was expanded in 1989.  Seven pastors have been called to Prince of Peace: Swanson, Huffman, Lundeen, Weidlich, Gerber, Kopka and Stoffel.

Mission

 To know Christ, through the power of the Holy Spirit at work in worship, prayer, the Gospel and one other
 To live Christ, by loving and honoring the Lord through accepting and nurturing one another on the journey of faith
 To share Christ, by inviting, welcoming, and encouraging all to share in the Peace of the Lord with the Christian family through Proclaiming the Gospel, Celebrating the Sacraments and Serving the Community

Activities

The church prides itself on the many organizations it operates.  Some of these groups include the church choir, children's choir, Sunday school, the A-Men (men's group), the women's group, the youth group, Build-on-our-Mission (BOOM) Committee, evangelism, stewardship, fellowship, mutual ministry, social ministry, finance, Christian education, and property.

The Church Today

Today the congregation consists of 207 baptized members led in worship by Rev. Tim Seitz.  The church continues to host a range of fund-raising events throughout the year to support the church, community organizations, and the military.  The building itself, nearing fifty years old, is being well-maintained and updated as needed.  While traditional liturgy is still practiced most Sundays with service from the Lutheran Book of Worship, other services, including a contemporary Christian band, are sometimes used.

References
 Prince of Peace Lutheran Church—Prince of Peace web site, retrieved 10 May 2011
 Evangelical Lutheran Church of America—ELCA web site, retrieved 10 May 2011
 Woodridge Patch, retrieved 10 May 2011
 Records on file at Prince of Peace

External links
 Prince of Peace Lutheran Church
 Evangelical Lutheran Church of America
 Woodridge Patch
 West Suburban Food Pantry

Lutheran churches in Illinois
Christian organizations established in 1962
Woodridge, Illinois